Thrombosis and Haemostasis is a peer-review scientific journal of medicine. It is published by Thieme Medical Publishers. It is the official journal of several groups and societies: European Society of Cardiology (Thrombosis working group, Atherosclerosis and Vascular Biology working group), Sociedad Española de Trombosis y Hemostasia, Australian Vascular Biology Society, and Gesellschaft für Thrombose- und Hämostaseforschung e.V.  A related publication is TH Open. The journal was established in 1957 and is published monthly. The current editors-in-chief are Christian Weber and Gregory Y. H. Lip.

Abstracting and indexing

The journal is abstracted and indexing in the following bibliographic databases:

According to the Journal Citation Reports, the journal has a 2017 impact factor of 4.952.

References

External links

Hematology journals
Publications established in 1957
English-language journals
Thieme academic journals
Monthly journals